San Pedro is a district of the Montes de Oca canton, in the San José province of Costa Rica.

Geography 
San Pedro has an area of  km2 and an elevation of  metres.

Demographics 

For the 2011 census, San Pedro had a population of  inhabitants.

Locations
The district is home to the University of Costa Rica, Universidad Latina de Costa Rica, and other institutions of higher learning.

Residential and commercial development is very high and commercial buildings are slowly taking the place of previous quiet suburbs.

Barrios (neighborhoods): Alhambra, Azáleas, Carmiol, Cedral, Dent (part), Francisco Peralta (part), Fuentes, Granja, Kezia, Lourdes, Monterrey, Nadori, Oriente, Pinto, Prados del Este, Roosevelt, San Gerardo (part), Santa Marta, Saprissa, Vargas Araya, Yoses

Transportation

Road transportation 
The district is covered by the following road routes:
 National Route 2
 National Route 39
 National Route 202
 National Route 203
 National Route 306

Rail transportation 
The Interurbano Line operated by Incofer goes through this district.

References 

Districts of San José Province
Populated places in San José Province